Andile Dlamini (born 2 September 1992) is a South African soccer player who plays as a goalkeeper for Mamelodi Sundowns and the South Africa women's national team.

Early life
Andile Dlamini was born on 2 September 1992 in Tembisa, a township of Johannesburg, South Africa.

Playing career

Club
Andile Dlamini took up professional football after playing against the South Africa women's national under-20 football team; she was subsequently selected for the team. Nicknamed "Sticks", she previously played for Phomolong Ladies, and currently for Mamelodi Sundowns.

International
She made her first appearance for the South Africa women's national football team against Botswana in 2011. Dlamini has routinely been the reserve goalkeeper for the team, with Thokozile Mndaweni and Roxanne Barker taking the first time spots. This has meant that although Dlamini has been named to the squads of both the 2012 Summer Olympics in London, United Kingdom, and the 2016 Summer Olympics in Rio de Janeiro, Brazil, she did not play any time at all during either tournaments. She was disappointed when South Africa were eliminated from the 2015 All Africa Games in the first round through a drawing after each team in the group stage drew all their games.

Following the arrival of coach Desiree Ellis, it was suggested that Dlamini could have a better chance of becoming the first choice goalkeeper, especially after Barker was released later than expected for friendlies and the 2016 Africa Women Cup of Nations tournament.

Personal life
Dlamini is a Christian, and reads the bible to prepare for football matches.

References

External links
 

1992 births
Living people
Soccer players from Johannesburg
Women's association football goalkeepers
Footballers at the 2016 Summer Olympics
South African women's soccer players
South Africa women's international soccer players
Olympic soccer players of South Africa
2019 FIFA Women's World Cup players
South African Christians